Centaure or Le Centaure is the French name of the mythological creature the centaur, and may also refer to:

Ships
, a French Navy ship in service from 1712 to 1756
, a French Navy ship that sank in 1750
, a 74-gun ship of the line of the French Navy launched in 1757 and captured by the Royal Navy in 1759 and renamed HMS Centaur
, a French Navy ship launched in 1782 and destroyed by fire in 1793
, an 80-gun Bucentaure'''-class ship of the line of the French Navy
, a French Navy tug launched in 1912 and renamed Nessus in 1932
, a French Navy submarine in commission from 1935 to 1952
, a French Navy dredger in commission from 1955 to 1970
, a French Navy tug in commission from 1974 to 1999

Ship class
Centaure-class ship of the line

Other uses
Centaure (rocket), a two-stage French research rocket
Centaurus, a constellation known as Le Centaure'' in French

See also
Centaur (disambiguation)
Centauri (disambiguation)
Centaurus (disambiguation)